The Definitive Collection is a 1997 2 CD compilation by The Alan Parsons Project, released through Arista Records. It includes two songs taken from Alan Parsons' first solo album.

Track listing
All tracks written by Alan Parsons and Eric Woolfson, except where noted.

Disc 1
 "(The System of) Doctor Tarr and Professor Fether" - 4.22
 "The Raven" - 4.08
 "I Robot" - 6.02
 "I Wouldn't Want to Be Like You" - 3.23
 "Breakdown" - 3.51
 "Don't Let it Show" - 4.26
 "Voyager" - 2.25
 "What Goes Up" - 3.31
 "The Eagle Will Rise Again" - 4.21
 "Can't Take it With You" - 5.07
 "Pyramania" - 2.44
 "Damned if I Do" - 4.54
 "Lucifer" - 5.03
 "If I Could Change Your Mind" - 5.51
 "The Turn of a Friendly Card (Part 1)" - 2.43
 "Snake Eyes" - 3.18
 "Games People Play" - 4.25
 "Time" - 5.05

Tracks 1-2 taken from Tales of Mystery and Imagination (1976); they were not included on the European release of this album.
Tracks 3-6 taken from I Robot (1977).
Tracks 7-11 taken from Pyramid (1978).
Tracks 12-14 taken from Eve (1979).
Tracks 15-18 taken from The Turn of a Friendly Card (1980).

Disc 2
 "Sirius" - 1.57
 "Eye in the Sky" - 4.36
 "Psychobabble" - 4.51
 "Mammagamma" - 3.34
 "Old and Wise" - 4.57
 "Prime Time" - 5.03
 "Don't Answer Me" - 4.13
 "You Don't Believe" - 4.26
 "Let's Talk About Me" - 4.29
 "Days Are Numbers (The Traveller)" - 4.27
 "Stereotomy" - 7.03
 "In the Real World" - 4.19
 "Standing on Higher Ground" - 5.47
 "Too Late" - 4.32
 "Turn it Up" (Ian Bairnson) - 6.13
 "Re-Jigue" (Parsons, Andrew Powell) - 2.31

Tracks 1-5 taken from Eye in the Sky (1982).
Tracks 6-8 taken from Ammonia Avenue (1983).
Tracks 9-10 taken from Vulture Culture (1984).
Tracks 11-12 taken from Stereotomy (1985).
Tracks 13-14 taken from Gaudi (1987).
Tracks 15-16 taken from Alan Parsons' solo album Try Anything Once (1993).

References

1997 compilation albums
Alan Parsons albums
Arista Records compilation albums